The 2003–04 Superliga season was the 16th since its establishment.

Athletic Bilbao repeated success and achieved their second title.

Teams and locations

League table

Results

See also
 2004 Copa de la Reina de Fútbol

References

Season on soccerway

2003-04
Spa
1
women